Nightbirds is an album by the all-female singing group Labelle, released in 1974 on the Epic label. The album features the group's biggest hit, the song "Lady Marmalade," and it became their most successful album to date.

Background
Labelle was a group in search of a hit. Despite creative control - member Nona Hendryx began composing most of the group's material - the group hadn't had commercial success with their first three albums - Labelle, Moon Shadow, and Pressure Cookin'. All albums had flirted with elements of rock music mixed with the group's soul/gospel roots from their days as Patti LaBelle and the Bluebelles. Despite this, the group became a draw as opening acts for The Who, Laura Nyro, and The Rolling Stones. Following their opening act on the Stones' 1973 U.S. tour, Epic Records signed the show to its roster.

The group was assigned to notable New Orleans producer Allen Toussaint and the group was sent to Toussaint's hometown of New Orleans to work on the record that would eventually be released as Nightbirds. They recorded the album in two months. Along with their adaptation of glam rock-styled outfits during their live performances, the group incorporated elements of funk music, something they included in their last album, Pressure Cookin on the song "Goin' On a Holiday." The funk direction continued with songs such as "Are You Lonely," "Somebody, Somewhere", "Space Children" and their famous hit, "Lady Marmalade". More experimental glam rockers such as "Nightbirds" and "It Took a Long Time" showed the group's range, while the album closer, "You Turn Me On" was a sexy R&B slow jam, which shocked past listeners of the Bluebelles' material.

Reception

The album became their most successful to date, becoming their first album to hit both the pop and R&B charts - neither of their previous albums charted - peaking at number seven on the latter chart, thanks to the phenomenal success of the funk single, "Lady Marmalade", one of the few songs not written by Nona Hendryx. The group's only other hit single, "What Can I Do For You", was written by Queens, New York musicians Edward Batts and James Ellison, who would continue to work for Patti LaBelle following the split of the group. The other members of their touring band, Jeffrey Shannon, drums, Hector Seda, bass, and Leslie "Chuggy" Carter, percussionist, where all responsible for their individual instrumental arrangements, of which, many were used on the Nightbird album and on all live performances.

The album remains their most successful album, certified platinum in the U.S. for selling over a million copies. Due to this success, Labelle landed on the cover of Rolling Stone.

Legacy
With Nightbirds, Labelle were praised for mixing their R&B/pop sound with elements of rock and funk. The success of the album's two singles also helped to pioneer the disco movement, which peaked in the late 1970s and influenced dance music for three decades. In 2003, the album was ranked number 272 on Rolling Stone's magazine's list of the 500 greatest albums of all time, and 274 in a 2012 revised list.  That same year, the album's leading hit track, "Lady Marmalade", was inducted to the Grammy Hall of Fame. Several acts have covered "Lady Marmalade" into international successes on their own including covers by All Saints and the quartet collaboration between singers Christina Aguilera, Mýa, Lil' Kim and Pink. "It Took a Long Time" was featured during the final scene and ending credits to the motion picture Precious: Based on the Novel "Push" by Sapphire.

Release history
In addition the standard 2 channel stereo version the album was also released by Epic in a 4 channel quadraphonic edition on LP record and 8-track tape. The quad LP was encoded using the SQ matrix format.

The album was reissued by Audio Fidelity on the Super Audio CD format in 2015. This version contains the complete stereo and quad mixes.

Track listing

Personnel
Patti LaBelle, Nona Hendryx & Sarah Dash - lead and backing vocals
Allen Toussaint - keyboards, percussion, guitar, arrangements
Art Neville - organ
George Porter Jr., Walter Payton - bass guitar
Leo Nocentelli, Rev. Edward Levone Batts - guitar
Smokey Johnson, Herman Ernest III - drums
James "Budd" Ellison - piano
Earl Turbinton - alto saxophone, soprano saxophone, clarinet
Alvin Thomas, Lon Price - tenor saxophone, flute
Clyde Kerr, Jr., Steve Howard - trumpet
Lester Caliste - trombone
Carl Blouin - baritone saxophone
Clarence Ford - alto saxophone
Jeffrey Shannon - drums, arrangements, touring band member
Hector Seda - bass guitar, arrangements, touring band member
Leslie "Chuggy" Carter - percussionist, arrangements, touring band member

Technical 
Vicki Wickham - executive producer
Ken Laxton - engineer

Charts

Weekly charts

Year-end charts

Singles

References

External links
 Labelle-Nightbirds  at Discogs

1974 albums
Labelle albums
Albums produced by Allen Toussaint
Epic Records albums
Albums recorded at Sea-Saint Studios